Anne Schoettle (born October 5, 1959) is an American television soap opera writer. She previously used Anne M. Schoettle as her screen name.

Her husband is David Shaughnessy. They have three daughters Amy, Katie and Josie.

Positions held

Guiding Light
  Script Writer: June 2005 - July 2005

The Bold and the Beautiful
 Script Writer: 2002 - 2003 (hired by Bradley Bell)

Days of Our Lives
 Production Associate/Associate Director: 1980-1983
 Script Writer: 1984-1985
 Co-Head Writer: 1986 - 1989
 Head Writer 1989-1991

Port Charles
 Associate Head Writer/Script Editor: 2000-2002

Sunset Beach
 Script Writer/Script Editor: 1997 - 1999

The Young and the Restless
 Consultant: 1992 - 1993 (hired by William J. Bell)
 Script Writer: October, 2009 - November 2015 (hired by Maria Arena Bell)
Breakdown Writer: November 2015
Script Writer: February 2018

Awards and nominations
Daytime Emmy Awards
Win, 2010 season, The Young and the Restless
Win, 2013 season, The Young and the Restless
Win, 2019 season, “The Young and the Restless”
Nomination, 1987 season, Days of our Lives
Nomination, 1985 season, Days of our Lives

Writers Guild of America Award
Nomination, 1997 season, Sunset Beach
Nomination, 1991 season, Days of our Lives
Nomination, 1987 season, Days of our Lives
Win, 2013 season, 'The Young and the Restless'
Win, 2020 season, “The Young and the Restless”

External links
 

1959 births
Living people
American soap opera writers
Place of birth missing (living people)
American women television writers
Women soap opera writers
21st-century American women